Paulo Sérgio Comelli (born 5 June 1960) is a Brazilian football manager.

Honours

Player 
Joinville
Campeonato Catarinense: 1981, 1982, 1983, 1984

Manager 
Gama
 Campeonato Brasiliense: 1998

Londrina
 Campeonato Paranaense Série B: 1999

São Bento
Campeonato Paulista Série A3: 2001

Sampaio Corrêa
 Campeonato Maranhense: 2002

Figueirense
 Campeonato Catarinense: 2004

CRB
 Campeonato Alagoano: 2012

References

UAE Pro League managers
1960 births
Living people
Brazilian football managers
Expatriate football managers in the United Arab Emirates
Campeonato Brasileiro Série A managers
Campeonato Brasileiro Série B managers
Joinville Esporte Clube players
Botafogo Futebol Clube (SP) players
Brasília Futebol Clube players
Sociedade Esportiva Matsubara players
Grêmio de Esportes Maringá managers
Mirassol Futebol Clube managers
Tuna Luso Brasileira managers
Esporte Clube Taubaté managers
Sociedade Esportiva do Gama managers
Vila Nova Futebol Clube managers
Londrina Esporte Clube managers
Esporte Clube São Bento managers
União São João Esporte Clube managers
Esporte Clube XV de Novembro (Piracicaba) managers
Sampaio Corrêa Futebol Clube managers
União Agrícola Barbarense Futebol Clube managers
Marília Atlético Clube managers
Ituano FC managers
Associação Portuguesa de Desportos managers
Figueirense FC managers
Ceilândia Esporte Clube managers
Esporte Clube Noroeste managers
Associação Desportiva São Caetano managers
Associação Atlética Ponte Preta managers
Esporte Clube Bahia managers
Paraná Clube managers
Oeste Futebol Clube managers
Sertãozinho Futebol Clube managers
Clube do Remo managers
Clube de Regatas Brasil managers
Criciúma Esporte Clube managers
América Futebol Clube (MG) managers
Emirates Club managers
Dibba Club managers
Brazilian footballers
Association footballers not categorized by position
Footballers from São Paulo (state)
People from Novo Horizonte, São Paulo